Carlin Hall, also known as Curtis Hall, Carlin Community Hall, Glencarlyn School, Glencarlyn Recreation Center, and is a historic community center located in the Glencarlyn section of Arlington, Virginia.  It was built in 1892, and is a tall one-story, frame, Late Victorian cross-plan community hall. It measures approximately 45 feet wide and 30 feet deep. The standing seam metal gable roof is topped by a four-sided wood cupola. It originally served as a meeting place for the newly formed Glencarlyn civic association and the Episcopal church congregation, provided a place for a variety of community
social events.  The building housed an elementary school from the 1920s to 1950. In 1953, it was returned by Arlington County as a community center.

It was listed on the National Register of Historic Places in 1993.

References

External links

Buildings and structures in Arlington County, Virginia
Buildings and structures completed in 1892
National Register of Historic Places in Arlington County, Virginia
Event venues on the National Register of Historic Places in Virginia
Victorian architecture in Virginia